Phulmania (2019) is an Indian, Nagpuri & Hindi film directed and produced by Lal Vijay Shahdeo and produced by Lal Vijay Shahdeo, Nitu Agarwal and Amrita Shahdeo. The film feature Komal Singh in female lead role. The story of the film has based on practice of witch hunting. The film was premiered at Jharkhand International Film Festival Awards (JIFFA) 2019 and the 72nd Cannes Film Festival in France. This film also shot in Hindi and released on ShemarooMe, Jio TV, Airtel, VI etc.

Plot
The film is based on true incident happened in Jharia.
The story of the film is on issue of witch hunting, gender discrimination and female infertility.

Cast
Komal Singh
Hansraj Jagtap
Vineet Kumar
Nitu Pande
Khusboo Sharma
Ravi Bhatia
Rina Sahay
Monika Mundu

Sound Tracks
The music has composed by Nandlal Nayak. Jyoti Sahu has given her voice in two songs and Mukund Nayak in one.

Controversy
The film ran into trouble due to its poster.

Release
The film released on 6 September 2019 in state capital Ranchi. The censor board issued the release certificate without any cuts. This is the first Nagpuri film released at a Multiplex.

Reception
The film mostly received positive reviews.

References

External links

Nagpuri-language films